Moon Lake is an unincorporated community located in Coahoma County, Mississippi, United States.

The community of Moon Lake is located along Moon Lake.

Moon Lake Casino
In 1926, the Clarksdale Elks Club built a lodge on Moon Lake.

The property changed ownership in 1936, and the Moon Lake Casino was opened there.

Tennessee Williams visited Moon Lake Casino, and referred to it in all but two of his plays.

Sarah Wright, who has owned the property since 1985, stated, "they loved to go to the Moon Lake Casino, because the place served Kansas City steaks and even flew in lobster from Maine, no easy task as airplane travel was then in its infancy. That was Tennessee's introduction to this place."

William Faulkner also visited the place, and referred to it in one of his novels as "Moon Lake Hotel."

Other writers and musicians, including John Faulkner and W.C. Handy, also visited and wrote about the property.

In 1946, new owners named it "Uncle Henry's Place."

A historic marker was placed there in 2008 by the Mississippi Department of Archives and History.

References

External links
 Uncle Henry's Place

Unincorporated communities in Coahoma County, Mississippi
Unincorporated communities in Mississippi